Borgolombardo railway station is a railway station in Italy. Located on the Milan–Bologna railway, it serves the village of Borgolombardo, a suburb of the town of San Giuliano Milanese. The station is located on Viale delle Crociate.

Services 
Borgolombardo is served by lines S1 and S12 of the Milan suburban railway service, operated by the Lombard railway company Trenord.

See also 
 Milan suburban railway service

References

External links 

Railway stations in Lombardy
Milan S Lines stations
Railway stations opened in 1991
1991 establishments in Italy
Railway stations in Italy opened in the 20th century